The 2021 Summer T20 Bash was a series of Twenty20 International (T20I) cricket matches played in the United Arab Emirates in October 2021 between Ireland, Namibia, Papua New Guinea, Scotland and the United Arab Emirates. The UAE played one match against Namibia and three matches against Ireland, Scotland played one match against Namibia and one against Papua New Guinea, and Papua New Guinea and Namibia played one match against each other. The matches were used as preparation for the 2021 ICC Men's T20 World Cup.

Two non-T20I twenty-over matches were also played, with Scotland beating Ireland by five wickets, and Namibia recording an 84 run victory over Papua New Guinea.

Squads

Warm-up matches

Fixtures

1st T20I

2nd T20I

3rd T20I

4th T20I

5th T20I

6th T20I

7th T20I

References

External links
 Ireland tour of the UAE Series home at ESPN Cricinfo
 Namibia tour of the UAE Series home at ESPN Cricinfo
 PNG v Scotland Series home at ESPN Cricinfo
 Namibia v Scotland Series home at ESPN Cricinfo
 Namibia v PNG Series home at ESPN Cricinfo

2021 in Emirati cricket
2021 in Irish cricket
2021 in Scottish cricket
2021 in Papua New Guinean cricket
International cricket competitions in 2021–22
Summer T20 Bash
Summer T20 Bash
Summer T20 Bash